Nicaragua competed at the 1980 Summer Olympics in Moscow, USSR.

Results by event

Athletics
Men's 400 m Hurdles
 Leonel Teller
 Heat — did not finish (→ did not advance)

Boxing
Men's Flyweight (– 51 kg)
 Onofre Ramirez
 First Round — Lost to Petar Lesov (Bulgaria) on points (0-5)

Men's Bantamweight (– 54 kg)
 Ernesto Alguera
 First Round — Bye
 Second Round — Lost to Bernardo Piñango (Venezuela) on points (1-4)

Swimming
Women's 100m Breaststroke
 Garnet Charwat
 Heats — 1:28.88 (→ did not advance)

References
Official Olympic Reports

Nations at the 1980 Summer Olympics
1980
Oly